In the 1994 Intertoto Cup no knock-out rounds were contested, and therefore no winner was declared.

Group stage
The teams were divided into 8 groups of 5 teams each. Opponents played each other once.

Group 1

Group 2

Group 3

The match between Tirol Innsbruck and Sparta Rotterdam was interrupted due to rain.

Group 4

Group 5

Group 6

Group 7

Group 8

See also
 1994–95 UEFA Champions League
 1994–95 UEFA Cup Winners' Cup
 1994–95 UEFA Cup

External links
  by Pawel Mogielnicki

1994
4